Jani Tanska (born 29 July 1988) is a retired Finnish professional footballer who played as a central defender. He was a product of MyPa youth academy and later spent three years with Charlton Athletic in 2004–2007.

Career

Club career
Tanska made his Veikkausliiga debut with MyPa in 2004. He joined Norwegian side FC Lyn Oslo on loan for the 2006 season. Between 2008 and 2013, he played in Finland with KooTeePee, Jaro, VPS and TPS.

After a year with FC Lahti, Tanska was transferred to the Swedish club Assyriska FF in 2015,
but ended up playing only six games there before his contract was terminated for financial reasons. He then returned to Lahti and played there until the end of the 2016 Veikkausliiga season, after which he moved to Ilves.

Tanska rejoined FC Lahti for the 2019 season. The deal was announced already on 30 October 2018. Due to health reasons that had plagued him the last two seasons, 31-year-old Tanska announced his retirement in November 2019, despite having one year left of his contract.

References

External links

Veikkausliiga

Living people
1988 births
Finnish footballers
Finnish expatriate footballers
Myllykosken Pallo −47 players
Lyn Fotball players
FF Jaro players
Vaasan Palloseura players
FC Ilves players
Kotkan Työväen Palloilijat players
Turun Palloseura footballers
Assyriska FF players
FC Lahti players
Veikkausliiga players
Superettan players
Finland under-21 international footballers
Finland B international footballers
Association football defenders
Finnish expatriate sportspeople in England
Finnish expatriate sportspeople in Sweden
Expatriate footballers in England
Expatriate footballers in Sweden
Finland youth international footballers
Sportspeople from Kymenlaakso